Lingshu Jing, also known as Divine Pivot, Spiritual Pivot, or Numinous Pivot, is an ancient Chinese medical text whose earliest version was probably compiled in the 1st century BCE on the basis of earlier texts. It is one of two parts of a larger medical work known as the Huangdi Neijing (Inner Canon of Huangdi or Yellow Emperor's Inner Canon).  The other section, which is more commonly used in Traditional Chinese Medicine, is known as the Suwen  ("Basic Questions").

History

No version of the Lingshu prior to the 12th century has survived. Most scholars presume that the original title of the Lingshu was either Zhenjing ( "Classic of Acupuncture" or "Needling Canon") or Jiujuan ( "Nine Fascicles"). They base this conclusion on the following evidence:
 The Huangdi neijing was listed as a book in 18 juan  ("fascicles") in the bibliographical chapter ("Yiwenzhi" ) of Ban Gu's  Book of Han (Hanshu ). That chapter was itself based on the Qilue ( "Seven Summaries"), a bibliography that Liu Xiang  (79-8 BCE) and his son Liu Xin  (ca. 46 BCE-AD 23) compiled on the basis of a survey they began in 26 BCE.
 Zhang Zhongjing's preface to his Shanghan zabing lun ( "Treatise on Cold Injury and Miscellaneous Illnesses", written before 220 CE) mentions that he compiled his work on the basis of books that included the Suwen and the Jiujuan ( "Nine fascicles"). In turn, the passages that Huangfu Mi (215-282) attributed to the Jiujuan in his AB Canon of Acupuncture and Moxibustion (Zhenjiu jiayi jing ) all have equivalents in the received edition of the Lingshu.
 In the preface to his AB Canon of Acupuncture and Moxibustion, Huangfu Mi claimed that the book listed as Huangdi neijing in the "Qilue yiwenzhi"  was composed of two different parts: the Suwen ("Basic Questions") and the Zhenjing ("Needling Canon"), each in 9 juan, for a total of 18 juan.
 In the preface to Wang Bing's 762 edition of the Suwen (762 CE), where he identified Lingshu as the second of the two texts that comprised the Huangdi neijing in his time. This was the first instance of the title Lingshu.
 Various titles similar to Zhenjing and Lingshu appeared in the bibliographies of the Old Book of Tang (Jiu Tangshu ) and the New Book of Tang (Xin Tangshu ), suggesting that many different manuscript editions of a similar book were circulating in Tang times. The titles as seen in the Old Book of Tang were: Huangdi zhenjing ( "Yellow Emperor's Canon of Acupuncture") (in 9 juan), Huangdi zhenjiu jing ( "Yellow Emperor's Canon of Acupuncture and Moxibustion") (12 juan), Huangdi jiuling jing ( "Yellow Emperor's Nine-Spirit Canon"), and Yugui zhenjing ( "Canon of Acupuncture of the Golden Casket") (12 juan).
 Early in the 11th century, the Huangdi zhenjing ("Yellow Emperor's Canon of Acupuncture") was among the medical books the Goryeo court imported from Song China.
 In 1067, the editors of the Suwen admitted that "since the Lingshu is no longer complete, we can no longer be sure" whether what Wang Bing called "Lingshu" always referred to the Zhenjing.
 In 1091, the Song court requested a copy of the Zhenjing from Goryeo, which delivered the book in 1093.
 In 1155, a scholar called Shi Song , "regretting that Lingshu has long been out of circulation," presented his 24-juan edition of that book to the imperial court. His recension claimed to be based on a copy kept in his family, which he compared with fragments cited in other works. His renaming of the "Zhenjing" to "Lingshu" followed Wang Bing.

Editions

All current editions of the Lingshu are based on Shi Song's edition from 1155. The earliest extant edition was made in 1339 and 1340, under the Yuan dynasty, by a publishing house called the Gulin shutang . One copy of this edition is still preserved at the National Library of China (Guojia tushuguan ) in Beijing. The Gulin shutang edition was the earliest known joint edition of Lingshu and Suwen.

Historical significance

Many practitioners through the ages have believed that the name "Lingshu" reflected the complex esoteric nature of the writings. It has been suggested that only someone of sufficient spiritual advancement (i.e. "Ling") could fully understand its true messages.

Footnotes

Bibliography

External links
 Full text of the Lingshu Jing

Chinese classic texts
History of ancient medicine
Medical manuals
Chinese medical texts